is a Japanese football player for Avispa Fukuoka.

Career
While playing for Biwako Seikei Sport College, Miya was selected as the best player in the Kansai Student Football League. In January 2018, Vissel Kobe opted to sign him.

Club statistics
Updated to 21 July 2022.

References

External links

Profile at J. League
Profile at Vissel Kobe

1996 births
Living people
Association football people from Osaka Prefecture
Japanese footballers
J1 League players
J2 League players
Vissel Kobe players
Mito HollyHock players
Sagan Tosu players
Avispa Fukuoka players
Association football defenders